The Burdened is a 2023 Yemeni drama film based on a true story. It is the second film directed by Yemeni filmmaker Amr Gamal.

Plot 
The film talks about struggling of a Yemeni family in the port city of Aden in the southern region of Yemen. It follows Ahmed, his pregnant wife Isra’a and their three children after they both lost their jobs due to the economic crisis.

Cast 

 Khaled Hamdan as Ahmed
 Abeer Mohammed as Isra'a
 Samah Alamrani as Muna
 Awsam Abdulrahman as Abbas
 Shahd Algonfedy as Hend

Awards 

 2023: Amnesty International Film Award, 2023
 2023: Panorama Audience Award 2023 winner – Feature film
 2018: Works in Progress Post-Production Development Award Karlovy Vary International Film Festival

See also 
 10 Days Before the Wedding

References

External links 
 

2023 films
Yemeni films
2023 drama films
2020s Arabic-language films
Films about abortion